Peter Sydney Larkin (August 25, 1926 – December 16, 2019) was an American scenic and production designer.

Early life
Larkin was born in 1926 in Boston, Massachusetts, the son of Ruth Lily (McIntire) and Oliver Waterman Larkin, an art historian. Larkin was educated at the Deerfield Academy and Yale University.

Career
Larkin first designed the set of the 1951 Broadway adaptation of The Wild Duck by Henrik Ibsen. Over the course of his career, he was a scenic or production designer for Dial M for Murder, Peter Pan, The Teahouse of the August Moon and No Time for Sergeants, Tootsie, and Get Shorty. He won four Tony Awards for Best Scenic Design.

Personal life and death
Larkin married Racelle Strick, a painter who died in 2008. His stepson, Wesley Strick, is a screenwriter. Larkin resided in Bridgehampton, New York, where he died on December 16, 2019, at age 93.

References

External links
 W.H. Crain Costume and Scene Design Collection at the Harry Ransom Center

1926 births
2019 deaths
People from Boston
People from Bridgehampton, New York
Deerfield Academy alumni
Yale University alumni
American scenic designers
American production designers
Tony Award winners